The 1980 Firecracker 400 was a NASCAR Winston Cup Series racing event that took place on July 4, 1980, at Daytona International Speedway in Daytona Beach, Florida. The NASCAR Winston Cup Series was also plagued with top teams running big engines and finishing in third place to avoid inspection around the early-1980s.

Race report
Bobby Allison was the final driver to win in a Mercury for the Ford Motor Company; he beat David Pearson by six car lengths. Pearson had a strong runner-up performance here despite leading only three laps. Other notable competitors included Dale Earnhardt, Richard Petty, Richard Childress and Bill Elliott. Out of forty participants, eleven competitors failed to finish the race. Cale Yarborough was credited for finishing last place with an overheated engine. The race took two hours, eighteen minutes, and eleven seconds to complete. Phil Finney had a violent crash off turn 4 and inflicted terminal damage to his vehicle on lap 152.

All drivers were born in the United States of America. The Ford and Mercury cars of the early-1980s weren't exactly aerodynamic wonders compared to the General Motors cars. Also this was the era before Ernie Elliott figured out how to make the 351 Cleveland rev in the same high ranges that the Chevys were running without breaking valve springs. By the late-1980s and early-1990s, the Ford and Mercury cars could compete on a more equal basis with the General Motor cars (especially the Chevrolet cars that would go on to dominate NASCAR in the 21st century). 

Safety regulations made within the 1980s and 1990s would slow down the speed of vehicles in both the Firecracker 400 and the Daytona 500. Three cautions slowed the race for 11 laps. Fifty-four thousand spectators were in attendance. Out of the forty drivers in the grid, ten of them failed to finish the race due to car problems. On the day after the race, Lennie Pond made a celebrity appearance at a Burger King in nearby South Daytona; entertaining customers for three hours in the days before celebrity appearances were mainstream in the racing community.

Rick Wilson made his NASCAR debut in this event while Phil Finney and John Greenwood retired from NASCAR racing after this race.

Finishing order
Section reference: 

 Bobby Allison
 David Pearson†
 Dale Earnhardt† 
 Buddy Baker†
 Richard Petty
 Benny Parsons†
 Jody Ridley
 Richard Childress
 John Anderson†
 Buddy Arrington
 Lennie Pond
 Bill Elliott
 Ricky Rudd
 Coo Coo Marlin†
 Rick Wilson
 Harry Gant
 Ronnie Thomas
 Steve Moore
 Donnie Allison
 Phil Finney*
 John Greenwood
 Don Whittington
 J.D. McDuffie†
 James Hylton†
 Jim Vandiver
 Jimmy Means
 Roger Hamby
 Tommy Gale†
 Cecil Gordon†
 Marty Robbins*†
 Darrell Waltrip*
 Terry Labonte*
 Dave Marcis*
 Neil Bonnett*†
 Bruce Hill*
 Tighe Scott*
 Chuck Bown*
 Lake Speed*
 Connie Saylor*†
 Cale Yarborough*

* Driver failed to finish race
† signifies that the driver is known to be deceased

Standings after the race

References

Firecracker 400
Firecracker 400
NASCAR races at Daytona International Speedway